Bhaisunda, also spelt 'Bhaisaunda', was a princely state in India during the British Raj.

History
Bhaisaunda state was founded in 1812 by the Kalinjar family.
It was one of the Chaube Jagirs, which were part of the Bagelkhand Agency of British India.

Practically all the inhabitants of the Jagir were Hindu. The capital was the village of Bhaisunda, located at 25° 18′ N, 80° 48′ E..
In 1948, one year after Indian independence, Bhaisunda was merged into the Indian state of Vindhya Pradesh.

Rulers
The rulers of Bhaisunda were titled 'Chaube' and from 1885, 'Rao Chaube'.

Chaubes
1812 - 1829                Newal Kishor                        (d. 1829)
1829 - 18..                Acharju Sing                        (b. c.1819 - d. ... )
1829 - 1840                Zirat Prasad -Regent
1840? - 10 Oct 1885        Tirath Prasad                       (b. 1822 - d. 1885)

Rao Chaubes
10 Oct 1885 -  8 Jan 1916  Chhatarsal Prasad                   (b. 1877 - d. 1916)
10 Oct 1885 - 1896        ... -Regent
 8 Jan 1916 -  4 Nov 1916  Bharat Prasad                       (b. 1884 - d. 1916)
 4 Nov 1916 - 1947         Govind Prasad                       (b. 1884 - d. af.1948)

See also 
 Bundelkhand Agency
 Political integration of India

References 

Satna district
Princely states of Madhya Pradesh
1812 establishments in India